Sean-Marco Vorster (born 18 September 1991), is a South African actor, writer, director and assistant director. He is best known for the roles in the films, Die Windpomp (2014), Lyfstraf (2012) and Strikdas (2015).

Personal life
Vorster was born on 18 September 1991 in Paarl, South Africa. He completed high school at the Paarl Boys' High.

He is married to fellow actress Jay Antsey since 2021.

Career
In 2012, two weeks after writing his school finals, he made his maiden film appearance on the first Afrikaans horror film, Lyfstraf directed by Rudi Steyn. In the film, he played the supporting role "Dietmar". In the meantime, he studied acting at the AFDA, The School for the Creative Economy. In the same year, he worked as the assistant director of the short film Nantes. In 2014, he made the lead role as "Jaco du Toit", in the SABC1 youth drama series Amaza. After that success, he then acted in the film Die Windpomp directed by Etienne Fourie in the same year.

In 2014 he joined as a co-presenter of the SABC3 Afrikaans lifestyle and magazine program NAweek. Apart from that, he acted in many films such as, Strikdas, Lea to the Rescue, Susters and Vergeet my nie. In 2020, he joined with the original cast of M-Net soapie Legacy and playing the role "Stefan Potgieter". He also owns a production company, where he is working in Nigeria, Kenya, Tanzania and Congo by directing advertisements.

Filmography

References

External links
 

Living people
1991 births
21st-century South African male actors
People from Paarl
South African male film actors
South African male television actors